First Person is an American TV series produced and directed by Errol Morris. The show engaged a varied group of individuals from civil advocates to criminals, and ran for two seasons, in 2000–2001.

Interviews were conducted with "The Interrotron", a device similar to a teleprompter: Errol and his subject each sit facing a camera. The image of each person's face is then projected onto a two-way mirror positioned in front of the lens of the other's camera. Instead of looking at a blank lens, then, both Morris and his subject are looking directly at a human face. (Diagram) Morris believes that the machine encourages monologue in the interview process, while also encouraging the interviewees to "express themselves to camera".

The name "Interrotron" was coined by Morris's wife, who, according to Morris, "liked the name because it combined two important concepts — terror and interview."

One episode was dedicated to debtor's advocate Andrew Capoccia, wherein he laid out his philosophy on debt reduction.  Shortly after the series aired, Cappocia was tried and convicted of fraud and imprisoned.

Episodes

Season 1
 "Stairway to Heaven" — Temple Grandin, autistic college professor and expert on humane cattle slaughter techniques
 "The Killer Inside Me" — Sondra London, American true crime author.
 "I Dismember Mama" — Saul Kent, promoter of cryogenic immortality
 "The Stalker" — Bill Kinsley, employer and victim of the disgruntled postal worker Thomas McIlvane
 "The Parrot" — Jane Gill, victim of a murder with a possible avian eyewitness
 "Eyeball to Eyeball" — Clyde Roper, authority on the giant squid
 "Smiling in a Jar" — Gretchen Worden, director of the Mütter Museum of medical oddities in Philadelphia
 "In the Kingdom of the Unabomber" — Gary Greenberg, Unabomber pen pal and would-be biographer
 "Mr. Debt" — Andrew Capoccia, lawyer for credit-card debtors (since disbarred and convicted)
 "You're Soaking In It" — Joan Dougherty, crime scene cleaner
 "The Little Gray Man" — Antonio Mendez, retired CIA operative and master of disguise

Season 2
 "Harvesting Me" — Josh Harris, internet entrepreneur and television addict also featured in the documentary We Live in Public
 "The Smartest Man in the World" — Chris Langan, bar bouncer with the alleged world's highest IQ
 "The Only Truth" — Murray Richman, lawyer to New York mobsters
 "One in a Million Trillion" — Rick Rosner, professional high school student and Who Wants to be a Millionaire? contestant
 "Mr. Personality" — Dr. Michael Stone, forensic psychologist and homicide aficionado, host of Most Evil
 "Leaving the Earth" — Denny Fitch, DC-10 pilot and hero

References

Films directed by Errol Morris
Films produced by Errol Morris
2000s American documentary television series